Xylotoles aegrotus is a species of beetle in the family Cerambycidae. It was described by Bates in 1874. It is known from New Zealand.

References

Dorcadiini
Beetles described in 1874